Coldstream Airport  is a small Australian regional airfield located in the township of Coldstream in Greater Melbourne, Victoria.

History
The airstrip at Coldstream was established in March 1962 by Jim Doake, and the airport is still owned by the Doake family. From January 1996, the airfield was operated by the Royal Victorian Aero Club as the base for its flight training school. In February 2011, the RVAC committee voted to relinquish its operation of the airfield, and the flying school's chief pilot, Bob Boyd, took over its operation as Yarra Valley Flight Training on 1 August 2011. The runway was sealed in April 2014, and is the only sealed strip in the Yarra Valley.

The airfield was also the base of AvServe until 2018 when it closed down.

See also
 List of airports in Victoria

References

External links
Coldstream Airport
Yarra Valley Flight Training
AvServe

Airports in Victoria (Australia)
1962 establishments in Australia
Airports established in 1962